The Mills County Courthouse, built in 1913, is an historic three-story Classical Revival-style courthouse building located  at 1011 Fourth Street in Goldthwaite, Texas. Designed by San Antonio architect Henry Truman Phelps (1871–1944), it replaced the first courthouse built in 1890, which burned in 1912.

The three-story building, made of brick with a cast stone basement, is the most prominent building in Goldthwaite.  On November 8, 2000, it was added to the National Register of Historic Places.

See also

National Register of Historic Places listings in Mills County, Texas
Recorded Texas Historic Landmarks in Mills County
List of county courthouses in Texas

References

External links

Courthouses on the National Register of Historic Places in Texas
Neoclassical architecture in Texas
Government buildings completed in 1913
Buildings and structures in Mills County, Texas
Mills
1913 establishments in Texas
National Register of Historic Places in Mills County, Texas